Peter Suder (April 16, 1916 – November 14, 2006), nicknamed "Pecky", was an American professional baseball player, a utility infielder for the Philadelphia / Kansas City Athletics (1941–43, 1946–55).

Suder's 20-year career began in 1935 and was interrupted during World War II by 1944–45 service in the United States Army in the European Theater of Operations.

Suder led the American League in grounding into double plays (23) in 1941. He is also the Athletics' all-time leader in grounding into double plays (158). Suder participated in 94 double plays that year, 85 as a second baseman (where he alternated with future Baseball Hall of Famer Nellie Fox) and nine at third base.

In 13 seasons he played in 1,421 games, had 5,085 at bats, 469 runs, 1,268 hits, 210 doubles, 44 triples, 49 home runs, 541 runs batted in, 19 stolen bases, 288 bases on balls, a .249 batting average, .290 on-base percentage, .337 slugging percentage, 1,713 total bases and 92 sacrifice hits.

He died, aged 90, in Aliquippa.

See also
List of Major League Baseball players who spent their entire career with one franchise

References

External links

 Bio at Baseball Almanac

1916 births
2006 deaths
Akron Yankees players
American people of Serbian descent
Baseball players from Pennsylvania
Binghamton Triplets players
Kansas City Athletics players
Major League Baseball second basemen
Major League Baseball shortstops
Major League Baseball third basemen
Minor league baseball managers
Norfolk Tars players
People from Aliquippa, Pennsylvania
Philadelphia Athletics players
Washington Generals (baseball) players
United States Army personnel of World War II